"Rockin' with the Rhythm of the Rain"  is a song written by Brent Maher and Don Schlitz, and recorded by American country music duo The Judds.  It was released in May 1986 as the third single from the album Rockin' with the Rhythm.  The song was their seventh number one country single.  The single went to number one for one week and spent twelve weeks on the country chart.

Chart performance

References
 

Songs about weather
1986 singles
1985 songs
The Judds songs
RPM Country Tracks number-one singles of the year
Songs written by Don Schlitz
RCA Records singles
Curb Records singles
Songs written by Brent Maher
Song recordings produced by Brent Maher